Peter Schneider may refer to:

 Peter Schneider (actor) (born 1975), German actor
 Peter Schneider (conductor) (born 1939), Austrian conductor and chorusmaster
 Peter Schneider (film executive), American movie executive, former president of the Walt Disney Studios
 Peter Schneider (ice hockey) (born 1991), Austrian ice hockey player
 Peter Schneider (mathematician) (born 1953), German mathematician
 Peter Schneider (writer) (born 1940), German novelist
 Peter Schneider (Zen priest) (born 1937), Zen priest, founder of Beginner's Mind Zen Center, Northridge, California